Brezje may refer to:

Bosnia and Herzegovina
 Brezje, Čelić, a village
 Brezje (Goražde), a village
 Brezje (Rogatica), a village in Republika Srpska
 Brezje (Višegrad), a village

Croatia
 Brezje, Croatia, a village near Sveta Nedelja, Zagreb County
 Brezje, Međimurje County, Croatia

Slovenia:
Brezje, Cerknica – Municipality of Cerknica, southwestern Slovenia
Brezje, Mozirje – Municipality of Mozirje, northeastern Slovenia
Brezje, Novo Mesto – City Municipality of Novo Mesto, southeastern Slovenia
Brezje, Radovljica – Municipality of Radovljica, northwestern Slovenia
Brezje, Sevnica – Municipality of Sevnica, southeastern Slovenia
Brezje, Škofljica – Municipality of Škofljica, central Slovenia
Brezje, Sveti Jurij ob Ščavnici – Municipality of Sveti Jurij ob Ščavnici, northeastern Slovenia
Brezje, Zagorje ob Savi – Municipality of Zagorje ob Savi, central Slovenia
Brezje nad Kamnikom – Municipality of Kamnik, northern Slovenia
Brezje ob Slomu – Municipality of Šentjur, eastern Slovenia
Brezje pod Nanosom – Municipality of Postojna, southwestern Slovenia
Brezje pri Bojsnem – Municipality of Brežice, southeastern Slovenia
Brezje pri Dobjem – Municipality of Dobje, eastern Slovenia
Brezje pri Dobrovi – Municipality of Dobrova-Polhov Gradec, northwestern Slovenia
Brezje pri Dobu – Municipality of Domžale, central Slovenia
Brezje pri Dovškem – Municipality of Krško, southeastern Slovenia
Brezje pri Grosupljem – Municipality of Grosuplje, southeastern Slovenia
Brezje pri Kumpolju – Municipality of Litija, central Slovenia
Brezje pri Lekmarju – Municipality of Šmarje pri Jelšah, eastern Slovenia
Brezje pri Lipoglavu – City Municipality of Ljubljana, central Slovenia
Brezje pri Ločah – Municipality of Slovenske Konjice, northeastern Slovenia
Brezje pri Oplotnici – Municipality of Oplotnica, eastern Slovenia
Brezje pri Podplatu – Municipality of Rogaška Slatina, northeastern Slovenia
Brezje pri Poljčanah – Municipality of Slovenska Bistrica, northeastern Slovenia
Brezje pri Raki – Municipality of Krško, southeastern Slovenia
Brezje pri Rožnem Dolu – Municipality of Semič, southeastern Slovenia
Brezje pri Senušah – Municipality of Krško, southeastern Slovenia
Brezje pri Slovenski Bistrici – Municipality of Slovenska Bistrica, northeastern Slovenia
Brezje pri Šentjerneju – Municipality of Šentjernej, southeastern Slovenia
Brezje pri Trebelnem – Municipality of Trebnje, southeastern Slovenia
Brezje pri Tržiču – Municipality of Tržič, northwestern Slovenia
Brezje pri Veliki Dolini – Municipality of Brežice, southeastern Slovenia
Brezje pri Vinjem Vrhu – Municipality of Semič, southeastern Slovenia
Brezje v Podbočju – Municipality of Krško, southeastern Slovenia
Brezovica pri Črmošnjicah – Municipality of Semič, known as Brezje until 1955, southeastern Slovenia
Hudo Brezje  – Municipality of Sevnica, southeastern Slovenia
Staro Brezje – Municipality of Kočevje, southern Slovenia